A pie bird, pie vent, pie whistle, pie funnel, or pie chimney is a hollow ceramic device, originating in Europe, shaped like a funnel, chimney, or upstretched bird with open beak used for supporting or venting a pie.  Occasionally other whimsical shapes are used.

History
Pies with top crusts need to be vented, to allow steam to escape.  Funnel-style steam vents have been placed in the center of fruit and meat pies during cooking since Victorian times; bird shapes came later. The bird shape was likely inspired by the "four and twenty blackbirds baked in a pie" from the nursery rhyme "Sing a Song of Sixpence"; that "the birds began to sing" suggests a means for a vent.

Pie funnels were used to prevent pie filling from boiling up and leaking through the crust by allowing steam to escape from inside the pie.  They also supported the pastry crust in the center of the pie, so that it did not sag in the middle, and are occasionally known as "crustholders".  Older ovens had more problems with uniform heating, and the pie bird prevented boil-over in pie cooking.

The traditional inverted funnels, with arches on the bottom for steam to enter, were followed by ceramic birds; and from the 1940s they have been produced in a multitude of designs. Creigiau Pottery of South Wales produced a 'Welsh Pie Dragon' in copper lustreware. This trend has been particularly noticeable in recent times, due to their increasing popularity as gifts and collectors' items rather than simply utilitarian kitchen tools.

References 

Kitchenware
Cookware and bakeware